Severi may refer to:

Severi (surname), Italian surname
Severan dynasty, dynasty of Roman emperors, ruling in the late 2nd and early 3rd century
Severi (tribe), tribe that participated in the formation of the First Bulgarian Empire in the 7th century

Finnish given name
Severi Alanne (1879-1960), Finnish-American chemical engineer, dictionary compiler, socialist journalist, and consumers' co-operative organizer
Severi Paajanen (born 1986), Finnish footballer 
Severi Sillanpää, Finnish ice hockey player

Finnish masculine given names